The Rev. John Young Stratton (1829/30 – 30 March 1905) was an author, essayist, social reformer, campaigner against rural poverty, and Rector of Ditton, Kent for 48 years. He is remembered mainly for his tireless campaigning to improve the lives of farm labourers and hop-pickers.

Early life, education and family
John Stratton was born in Boughton, Norfolk in late 1829 or very early in 1830. His father, William, was the parish curate and the family remained in Boughton until 1838 when William was appointed Vicar of Gressingham in Lancashire.
Educated at Heversham Grammar School in Westmorland (now Cumbria) and Magdalene College, Cambridge, he graduated in 1853 and was ordained deacon the same year. Ordained priest in 1855, he was appointed Rector of Ditton in 1856.

In 1870, John Stratton married Anne Louisa Taylor of Boughton Monchelsea Place. Their marriage produced six children.

In his personal financial affairs, he was shrewd. In 1876, he purchased the Ditton Place estate from Septimus Maitland, renting out the mansion and farmland, and selling off plots of land for development.

Rural poverty
Raised in a rural parish, John Stratton was no stranger to the poverty of farm labourers. While no firebrand, his early writing nevertheless reveals a mind bristling with ideas on reform. Now the incumbent of a parish dominated by agriculture, he found himself well-placed to apply his abundant energy to the issue.
Stratton dismissed the accepted practice of dealing with rural poverty through the perpetual giving of poor relief, which provided only short term relief of its symptoms. Instead, he believed the underlying disease of poverty could be cured through encouraging and facilitating self-help and self-improvement. In 1864, he consolidated his ideas into a lengthy article, The Life of a Farm Labourer, published in The Cornhill Magazine.

Central to his self-help philosophy was the creation of large, trustworthy and well-managed friendly societies. He was confident that once the reliability of such societies was demonstrated to labourers, large numbers would be encouraged to join and contribute, to all members' mutual benefit. Stratton realised that scale was key to a friendly society's success and in a pamphlet published in 1868, he advocated for a national insurance scheme administered through the Post Office. His proposals closely mirror the modern welfare state in the United Kingdom, although it was to be a further 43 years before the passing of the first National Insurance Act.

His ambition to broadcast his message to farmers and landowners nationwide received a boost in 1870, when the Journal of the Royal Agricultural Society of England published his essay, Farm Labourers, their Friendly Societies, and the Poor Law.
Practising what he preached, John Stratton was involved in the management of the Kent Friendly Society for 25 years, initially as joint honorary secretary and then as president.

Hop-pickers
Despite his strident advocacy over so many years for the establishment and competent management of large friendly societies, John Stratton is perhaps better remembered for his work to improve the living conditions and broader wellbeing of a group of seasonal visitors to the countryside, hop-pickers.

Hops were a valuable cash crop, and Kent, with its proximity and excellent transport links to London's breweries, produced more than any other county in England. Hop-picking was a very labour-intensive process. Every September, tens of thousands of men, women and children, primarily from East and South East London, and from the Medway towns, would descend on the county for three weeks to bring in the harvest. Most came year after year, viewing it as a kind of holiday, exchanging overcrowded streets and slums for the green fields and fresh air of the countryside. By the 1870s, so many people headed for the annual hop harvest that railway companies ran ‘Hop-Picker Specials’ to transport the workforce to Kent.

But with few exceptions, the conditions they faced on arrival were shocking. The overcrowded accommodation available might be a barn, stable, pigsty, cattle shed, or even a roof space. Sanitation was appalling, and often non-existent, sometimes with fatal consequences. In September 1849, an outbreak of cholera killed 43 "poor, half-starved, half-clothed" hop-pickers at East Farleigh, Kent.
By 1865, John Stratton decided it was time for action and he began to canvass support. The result was the formation of the Society for the Employment and Improved Lodging of Hop Pickers.

Despite the support of numerous prominent people, including peers, members of parliament and even the Archbishop of Canterbury, the Society initially struggled to persuade hop-growers to spend significant sums of money on improving facilities. A different approach was required. Hop-pickers were merely tolerated as a necessary evil. They were essential for the harvest, but as soon as they returned home, the permanent populations in hop-growing districts breathed a huge, collective sigh of relief. Hop-pickers brought with them petty crime, vandalism, violence and foul language, and their behaviour, in general, could outrage delicate Victorian sensitivities. Growers were fed up of being held responsible for the behaviour of ‘their’ hop-pickers, and it occurred to Stratton that their poor reputation might, strangely, prove their salvation.
The Society became an agency, supplying hop-pickers to growers. In return for agreeing to moderate their behaviour, hop-pickers would benefit from better living conditions. If a hop-picker crossed the line, they would receive a black mark from the Society, with every chance they would struggle to be placed in future. In that way, growers had at least some assurance of improved, if not perfect, behaviour. Equally, the Society could refuse to supply labour to a non-compliant grower. The scheme's beauty was that both sides stood to benefit from the arrangement and it soon took off. Growers even tolerated the agency fee of thruppence per picker, which funded the scheme's administration.

Hopper huts
Early improvements in accommodation were often limited to the provision of tents, but soon, more permanent structures, which became known as hopper huts, began to appear. Initially, many were constructed of wood with a corrugated iron roof, before brick-built structures became more common.
The Society's rules for hopper huts promoted space, light, security, and the provision of basic fixtures and fittings. Communal cooking facilities and a nearby supply of clean water were also requirements.

In 1874, the Sanitary Law Amendment Act was enacted. The Society used this legislation to encourage local authorities to pass the first by-laws covering hop-pickers' accommodation, the threat of legal sanction reinforcing the Society's rules.
John Stratton's championing of hop-pickers proved a great success. Not only did his tireless work make their lives more tolerable, but inevitably these improvements saved lives. While not a singlehanded effort, Stratton was the catalyst for change. Eventually, he recorded his ideas, along with a more general account of the hop industry, in a book, Hops and Hop-Pickers.

Later years and death
In additional to his work on behalf of friendly societies and hop-pickers, John Young Stratton was active in many other organisations and societies, frequently serving on their committees. Typically, when he died on 30 March 1905, he was on his feet addressing a conference.
He had been Rector of Ditton for 48 years. A highly respected and well-loved figure, his obituary referred to him as "probably the best known clergyman in Mid-Kent" and "the Hoppers' friend".

References

1905 deaths
19th-century Christian clergy
Year of birth uncertain
People from King's Lynn and West Norfolk (district)
People from Ditton, Kent